Peter Mills (born 31 March 1988) is an English badminton player who specializes in doubles. He started playing badminton in Southwell Junior Badminton Club at age 8, and became the England national badminton team at age 19. In 2007, he won the European Junior Badminton Championships in the boys' doubles event with Chris Adcock. He competed for England in the men's doubles and mixed team events at the 2014 Commonwealth Games where he won a bronze and silver medal respectively.

Achievements

Commonwealth Games
Men's doubles

European Junior Championships
Boys' doubles

BWF Grand Prix 
The BWF Grand Prix has two levels, the Grand Prix and Grand Prix Gold. It is a series of badminton tournaments sanctioned by the Badminton World Federation (BWF) since 2007.

Men's doubles

 BWF Grand Prix Gold tournament
 BWF Grand Prix tournament

BWF International Challenge/Series
Men's doubles

 BWF International Challenge tournament
 BWF International Series tournament

References

External links 
 
 
 

1988 births
Living people
Sportspeople from Nottingham
English male badminton players
Badminton players at the 2014 Commonwealth Games
Commonwealth Games silver medallists for England
Commonwealth Games bronze medallists for England
Commonwealth Games medallists in badminton
Medallists at the 2014 Commonwealth Games